Bacchisa nigroantennata is a species of beetle in the family Cerambycidae. It was described by Breuning in 1963. It is known from Laos.

References

N
Beetles described in 1963